The Spanish Aviation Safety and Security Agency, also known by the acronym AESA (Spanish: Agencia Estatal de Seguridad Aérea), is the civil aviation authority for Spain.

The agency is based in Madrid, where it occupies offices on the Paseo de la Castellana.

History
The agency was set up in 2008, taking over supervisory duties from the Dirección General de Aviación Civil (DGAC), a division of the Ministry of Transport, Mobility and Urban Agenda, the former Ministry of Public Works and Transport.

Its 2022 budget was €83.7 million.

References

External links
 

Aviation in Spain
Spain
Government agencies of Spain
Aviation organisations based in Spain